The 1987 San Diego Padres season was the 19th in franchise history. Rookie catcher Benito Santiago hit in 34 straight games, and later won the NL Rookie of the Year Award. The Padres were the only team not to hit a grand slam in 1987.

Offseason
 October 9, 1986: Dane Iorg was released by the Padres.
 December 11, 1986: Kevin McReynolds, Gene Walter, and Adam Ging (minors) were traded by the Padres to the New York Mets for Kevin Mitchell, Shawn Abner, Stan Jefferson, Kevin Armstrong (minors) and Kevin Brown (minors).
 December 18, 1986: Graig Nettles was released by the Padres.
 January 13, 1987: Tom Gorman was signed as a free agent by the Padres.

Regular season

Season standings

Record vs. opponents

Opening Day starters
 Tim Flannery
 Steve Garvey
 Tony Gwynn
 Andy Hawkins
 John Kruk
 Kevin Mitchell
 Benito Santiago
 Garry Templeton
 Marvell Wynne

Notable transactions
 April 25, 1987: Mark Wasinger and Tim Meagher (minors) were traded by the Padres to the San Francisco Giants for Colin Ward and Steve Miller (minors).
 June 4, 1987: Tom Gorman was traded by the Padres to the Minnesota Twins for Dave Blakely (minors).
 July 5, 1987: Kevin Mitchell, Dave Dravecky and Craig Lefferts were traded by the Padres to the San Francisco Giants for Chris Brown, Keith Comstock, Mark Davis, and Mark Grant.
 August 30, 1987: Storm Davis was traded by the Padres to the Oakland Athletics for players to be named later. The Athletics completed the deal by sending Dave Leiper to the Padres on August 31 and sending Rob Nelson to the Padres on September 8.

Roster

Player stats

Batting

Starters by position
Note: Pos = Position; G = Games played; AB = At bats; H = Hits; Avg. = Batting average; HR = Home runs; RBI = Runs batted in

Other batters
Note: G = Games played; AB = At bats; H = Hits; Avg. = Batting average; HR = Home runs; RBI = Runs batted in

Pitching

Starting pitchers 
Note: G = Games pitched; IP = Innings pitched; W = Wins; L = Losses; ERA = Earned run average; SO = Strikeouts

Other pitchers 
Note: G = Games pitched; IP = Innings pitched; W = Wins; L = Losses; ERA = Earned run average; SO = Strikeouts

Relief pitchers 
Note: G = Games pitched; W = Wins; L = Losses; SV = Saves; ERA = Earned run average; SO = Strikeouts

Awards and honors
 Benito Santiago, Rookie of the Year
 Tony Gwynn, National League Batting Champion, .370  
1987 Major League Baseball All-Star Game

Farm system 

LEAGUE CHAMPIONS: Spokane

References

External links
 1987 San Diego Padres at Baseball Reference
 1987 San Diego Padres at Baseball Almanac

San Diego Padres seasons
San Diego Padres season
San Diego Padres